Isabelle Spaak (born 5 October 1960) is a Belgian writer living in Paris.

The daughter of Fernand Spaak and Anna-Maria Farina, she was born in Brussels and grew up there. In July 1981, her mother killed her father and then committed suicide. Spaak moved to France later that year, attending Paris West University Nanterre La Défense.

She is perhaps best known for two autobiographical novels Ça ne se fait pas (2004), which received the Prix Victor-Rossel, and Pas du tout mon genre (2006). In 2011, she published Militants, a non-fiction work on the French Socialist party. Spaak published a third novel Une allure folle, based on the lives of her mother and grandmother, in 2016.

Publications
 Paris, 1999
 Ça ne se fait pas : roman, 2004
 Pas du tout mon genre : roman, 2006
 Militants, 2011
 Une allure folle : roman, 2016
 Une mère, etc., 2019

References 

1960 births
Living people
Belgian journalists
Belgian women novelists
Artists from Brussels
Belgian expatriates in France
Writers from Paris
21st-century Belgian novelists
Belgian non-fiction writers
21st-century Belgian women writers
Belgian women journalists